Thomas Muster was the two-time defending champion and successfully defended his title, defeating Fernando Meligeni in the final, 7–6(7–4), 7–5.

Seeds

Draw

Finals

Top half

Bottom half

References

External links
 Main draw (ITF)
 Main draw (ATP)

Abierto Mexicano Telcel - Singles